Silver Lake is a census-designated place (CDP) in Lake County, Florida, United States. The population was 1,879 at the 2010 census. It is part of the Orlando–Kissimmee Metropolitan Statistical Area.

Geography
Silver Lake is located in central Lake County and is bordered to the south by the city of Leesburg. U.S. Route 441 runs just south of Silver Lake, leading west  to the center of Leesburg and east the same distance to Tavares, the Lake county seat.

Silver Lake, a lake with the same name as the city, is entirely within the CDP.

Demographics

As of the census of 2000, there were 1,882 people, 810 households, and 563 families residing in the CDP. The racial makeup of the CDP was 90.91% White, 3.88% African American, 0.11% Native American, 3.40% Asian, 0.05% Pacific Islander, 0.64% from other races, and 1.01% from two or more races. Hispanic or Latino of any race were 2.23% of the population.

There were 810 households, 24.7% of which had children under the age of 18 living with them, 63.0% were married couples living together, 5.1% had a female householder with no husband present, and 30.4% were non-families. 24.6% of all households were made up of individuals, and 8.5% had someone living alone who was 65 years of age or older.  The average household size was 2.32 and the average family size was 2.77.

In the CDP, the population was spread out, with 20.5% under the age of 18, 5.6% from 18 to 24, 23.2% from 25 to 44, 28.7% from 45 to 64, and 22.0% who were 65 years of age or older.  The median age was 46 years. For every 100 females, there were 93.8 males.  For every 100 females age 18 and over, there were 94.2 males.

The median income for a household in the CDP was $55,347, and the median income for a family was $73,750. Males had a median income of $44,053 versus $30,750 for females. The per capita income for the CDP was $27,258.  About 6.5% of families and 8.8% of the population were below the poverty line, including 14.5% of those under age 18 and 6.3% of those age 65 or above.

References

Census-designated places in Lake County, Florida
Greater Orlando
Census-designated places in Florida